Paleozercon is an extinct genus of mites in the family Zerconidae.

The sole described species is P. cavernicolus. It was the first zerconid species to be recorded from a cave outside of Europe. P. cavernicolus differs from related genera in Zerconidae by lacking a characteristic incision in the peritremal shield and possessing a single pair of setae on the anterior margin of the ventroanal shield. It may have been an oligophagous predator which fed on other mites.

References

Zerconidae
Articles created by Qbugbot